Sittichok Paso (born 28 January 1999) is a Thai professional footballer who plays as a forward, he has also been used as a attacking midfielder for Thai League 1 club Chonburi.

Club career
Sittichok Paso was chosen from The Guardian to be 60 of the best young talents in world football in 2016 that could be the one from south-east Asia who finally debut in Europe.

Chonburi
Born in Samut Prakan province in Bangkok Metropolitan, Thailand, Sittichok became in sight of Witthaya Laohakul, a legendary football coach of Thailand, at the age of 12 from his superb form in the Prime Minister Cup, a regarded youth competition in Thailand. By the recommendation of Witthaya, who was then the technical director of Chonburi, Sittichok moved to study at a primary school in Chonburi in order to enter into the Chonburi academy. After impressive form during the loan spells with Sriracha and Phan Thong, he made his debut Thai Premier League in the second leg of season 2015 as a first-team player at the age of 16.

At early December 2016, Sittichok, together with his teammate Worachit, participated in J-League Open Trials 2016 and performed well in that trial. His excellent performance caught the sight of Kagoshima United that offered him another trial in January 2017. By his success in this trial, Sittichok signed the loan contract from Chonburi and became a first-team member of Kagoshima United since January 24, 2017 for initially one year.

FC Ryukyu (loan)
On 19 January 2021, it was announced that Sittichok had joined club FC Ryukyu on a season-long loan deal.

International career
On 26 May 2022, Paso was called up to the Thailand under-23 for the 2022 AFC U-23 Asian Cup.

International goals

Thailand U19

Thailand U23

References

External links
 

1999 births
Living people
Sittichok Paso
Association football forwards
Sittichok Paso
Kagoshima United FC players
Sittichok Paso
Japan Soccer League players
Thai expatriates in Japan
Sittichok Paso
Competitors at the 2019 Southeast Asian Games
Thai expatriate sportspeople in Japan
Sittichok Paso